The myth of superabundance is the belief that Earth has more than sufficient natural resources to satisfy humanity's needs, and that no matter how much of these resources humanity uses, the planet will continuously replenish the supply. The term was coined by US politician Stewart Udall in 1964 in his book The Quiet Crisis, though the idea had existed previously among 19th century US conservationists.

Udall described the myth as the belief that there was "so much land, so much water, so much timber, so many birds and beasts" that man did not envision a time where the planet would not replenish what had been sowed. The myth of superabundance began to circulate during Thomas Jefferson's presidency at the beginning of the nineteenth century and persuaded many Americans to exploit natural resources as they pleased with no thought of long-term consequences. According to historian of the North American West George Colpitts, "No theme became as integral to western promotion as natural abundance." Especially with respect to the American west after 1890, promotional literature encouraged migration by invoking the idea that God had provided an abundant environment where no man or family would fail if they sought to farm or otherwise live off the land. 

At that time, environmental science and the study of ecology barely allowed for the possibility of animal extinction and did not provide tools for measuring biomass or the limits of natural resources, therefore many speculators, settlers, and other parties were unaware of the potential impact of unsustainable practices that led to various extinctions, the Dust Bowl phenomenon, and other environmental catastrophes.

18th century manifestations in the US
In 1784, John Filson wrote The Discovery, Settlement And present State of Kentucky, which included the chapter "The Adventures of Colonel Daniel Boon". This work represents an early instance of the myth of superabundance, enticing settlers to Kentucky based on its abundance of resources.

19th century manifestations in the US 
Udall described the impacts of the myth on natural resources as "The Big Raid on resources". Udall describes the need for lumber in a growing nation for fuel, housing and paper as the first big raid on the Earth's natural resources that began to expose the myth of superabundance. It was only late in the nineteenth century that people became aware of empty hillsides and blackened woods from the lumber industry. Petroleum followed, as it was widely believed that oil was constantly made inside the Earth, and so, like everything else, was inexhaustible. Then came seal hunting, with a population that was estimated to be approximately five million cut in half by 1866. The Fur Seal Treaty (1911) saved the seals from becoming the first major marine species to become extinct as a consequence of the myth of superabundance.

The passenger pigeon was the largest wildlife species known to humanity in the early nineteenth century, when the bird's population was estimated at five billion. By the early 20th century, due to overhunting and habitat destruction brought about by the timber industry, the species had become extinct, the last passenger pigeon having died in the Cincinnati Zoo. 

The American buffalo was threatened by the myth of superabundance. They were considered to be the largest and most valuable resource because just about every piece of them was usable. The big kill of the buffalo began at the end of the Civil War when armies began killing the animals in an attempt to starve the Plains Indians. Railroad men wanted them killed in order to create more profit for the hides. Buffalo were killed for their tongues and hides, and some hunters simply wanted them as trophies. Pleas of protection for the buffalo were ignored, nearly wiping out the species.

During the Great Leap Forward in China in 1958 economic planners reduced the acreage space for planting wheat and grains, trying to force farmers and agricultural laborers into accepting new forms of industry. As a result, production of wheat and grain was slowed dangerously, and floods in the South and droughts in the North struck in 1959, helping create the conditions that led to the Great Chinese Famine.

US conservationists warnings 
George Perkins Marsh, who wrote Man and Nature in 1864, rejected the idea that any resource could be indefinitely exploited. Perkins had been witness to natural destruction and its impact on present prosperity. He believed that nature should not be exploited for economics or political gain. He was, after all, "forest born". Man's role as a catalyst of change in the natural world intrigued him. He believed that progress was entirely possible and necessary, if only men used wisdom in the management of resources. He cast doubt around the myth of superabundance and helped make way for John Muir in 1874. 

Muir, who had grown up surrounded by wilderness, believed that wildlife and nature could provide people with heightened sense abilities and experiences of awe that could not be found elsewhere. He advocated for the preservation of what he believed to be America's most beautiful nature, building on steps already taken by Frederick Law Olmsted, a young landscape architect who designed Central Park in New York City. Olmsted had persuaded Congress to pass a bill preserving much of Yosemite Valley, which President Lincoln had then approved in 1864. In 1872 President Grant signed the Yellowstone Park bill, saving over two million acres of wildlife.

Early successes 

Muir saw overgrazing destruction in Yosemite, in those parts which were not under protection. It was a result of nearby sheepmen and their herds. In 1876, Muir wrote an article "God’s First Temples – How Shall We Preserve Our Forests", which he published in the newspaper, pleading for help with protection of the forests. At first, he failed against the overriding ideal of the myth of superabundance, but he did inspire bills in the 1880s that sought to enlarge Yosemite's reservation. 

Muir formed the Sierra Club, a group of mountaineers and conservationists like him who had responded to his many articles. The Sierra Club's first big fight came as a counter-attack on lumbermen and stockmen who wanted to monopolize some of Yosemite County. Yosemite Valley, which was still owned by the state, was mismanaged and natural reserves like the meadows and Mirror Lake, which was dammed for irrigation, were still being destroyed even under supposed protection. In 1895, Muir and the Sierra Club began a battle that would span over ten years, fighting for natural management of Yosemite Valley. Theodore Roosevelt met with Muir in 1903 and was instantly fascinated with Muir's passion for the wilderness. Roosevelt approved Muir's argument for Yosemite Valley, and so the Sierra Club took their decade–long campaign to Sacramento, where they won against the California legislature in 1905. With Roosevelt on Muir's side, Yosemite Valley became part of Yosemite National Park and was allowed natural management.

20th century manifestations 
According to Udall the myth of superabundance was replaced in the 20th century by the myth of scientific supremacy: the belief that science can eventually find a solution to any problem. This leads to behaviors which, while recognizing that resources are not infinite, still fail to properly preserve those resources, putting the problem off to future generations to solve through science. "Present the repair bill to the next generation" is their silent motto. George Perkins Marsh had said that conservation's greatest enemies were "greed and shortsightedness".

Next steps 
Patsy Hallen wrote in the article, "The Art of Impurity" that an ethics development must occur in which respect for nature and our radical dependency on it can take place. Humans see themselves as superior to nature, and yet are in a constant state of continuity with it. Hallen argues that humanity cannot afford such an irrational state of mind and ecological denial if it expects to prosper in the future.

See also 

 Carrying capacity
 John L. McKenzie
 Peak oil
 Overexploitation
 Planetary boundaries
 Precautionary principle
 Stewart Udall
To Autumn (poem)

Notes

References 

Environmental conservation
Environmental issues
Scarcity
Obsolete scientific theories